Ambohitrandriana rural municipality in northern Madagascar, in the district of  Ambanja.

Nature
 Tsaratanana Reserve is partly situated in this municipality.

References

Populated places in Diana Region